Snøfrisk  is a Norwegian goat cheese made by Tine.

Snøfrisk is white and creamy, without any yellow pigmentation. The name translates as snow fresh. The cheese was  first introduced to the public in time for the 1994 Winter Olympics. Made from 80 percent goat cheese and 20 percent cow's milk cream, it is soft enough to be used as a spread. Snøfrisk is sold in a triangular plastic packaging and comes in several flavours, including straight, juniper berry, dill and forest mushrooms. Snøfrisk contains 25 percent fat and is fresh and sour with clear, but still round goat's milk taste. In addition to the natural version of Snøfrisk, the cheese is sold in varieties flavored with pepper, dill and red onion and thyme.

See also
 List of cheeses
 List of goat milk cheeses

References

Goat's-milk cheeses
Norwegian cheeses